Caldwell-Luc surgery, Caldwell-Luc operation, also known as Caldwell-Luc antrostomy, and Radical antrostomy, is an operation to remove irreversibly damaged mucosa of the maxillary sinus. It is done when maxillary sinusitis is not cured by medication or other non-invasive technique. The approach is mainly from the anterior wall of the maxilla bone. It was introduced by George Caldwell(1893)and Henry Luc(1897).
The maxillary sinus is entered from two separate openings, one in the canine fossa to gain access to the antrum and other in the naso antral wall for drainage.

Medical uses 
Chronic damage of cavity of maxilla bone.
Removal of foreign bodies.
 Malignancy of sinus.
Fracture of maxilla and/or orbital floor.
Abnormal growth of mucous membrane of sinus (polyp).
Dental cyst.
For management of hematoma or hemorrhage in the maxillary sinus
To treat fractures involving floor of the orbit or anterior maxillary sinus wall (transantral repair)

Contraindications 
It is rarely done in children as damage to secondary dentition may occur.

Complications 
Bleeding after surgery
Facial asymmetry
cheek discomfort
Damage to teeth

Procedure

Anaesthesia  
The operation may be performed under local anaesthesia but it is commonly carried under general anaesthesia. The use of topical anaesthesia and injection of adrenaline into soft tissue of canine fossa is recommended.

Technique 
First, the incision is made from lateral incisor to the second molar tooth. Then the flap of mucosa and periosteum is elevated and dissected to expose the anterior wall of sinus and then anterior wall  is opened in the canine fossa where the bone is relatively  thin with the drill. The opening can be enlarged by hayek or kerrison punch forceps to produce hole sufficiently large to provide access for example to allow removal of sinus mucosa or introduction of an endoscope and instruments.

The entire lining of sinus is dissected and removed as the success of the operation in chronic rhinosinusitis. Packing of nasal cavity and sinus is sometime required. Suturing of buccal incision is recommended with absorbable suture material.

The patient should be advised against overenthusiastic blowing of the nose for at least a week.

History 
It was described by George Caldwell in 1893 and Henry Luc in 1897. They describe the operation of maxillary sinus diseases via canine fossa. Functional endoscopic sinus surgery is the standard surgery for maxillary sinusitis nowadays.

References

Nose surgery
Sinus surgery